The Primetime Emmy Award for Outstanding Art Direction for a Single-Camera Series is a retired award that was handed out annually at the Creative Arts Emmy Awards. In 2014, the category was restructured into Outstanding Production Design for a Narrative Contemporary or Fantasy Program (One Hour or More), Outstanding Production Design for a Narrative Program (Half-Hour or Less) and Outstanding Production Design for a Narrative Period Program (One Hour or More).

Winners and nominations

1950s

1960s
Outstanding Achievement in Art Direction and Scenic Design

1970s
Outstanding Art Direction for a Dramatic Program or Series

Outstanding Art Direction for a Series

1980s

1990s

Outstanding Art Direction for a Single-Camera Series

2000s

2010s

Programs with multiple awards
Totals are combined with Production Design for a Narrative Contemporary or Fantasy Program and Production Design for a Narrative Period Program.

5 awards
 Boardwalk Empire (consecutive)

4 awards
 Game of Thrones (3 consecutive)

2 awards
 Rome (consecutive)
 The X-Files (consecutive)

Programs with multiple nominations
Totals are combined with Production Design for a Narrative Contemporary or Fantasy Program and Production Design for a Narrative Period Program.

11 nominations
 Murder, She Wrote

7 nominations
 Mad Men

6 nominations
 True Blood

5 nominations
 Boardwalk Empire
 Downton Abbey
 Dynasty
 Game of Thrones
 Mission: Impossible
 Six Feet Under
 Star Trek: The Next Generation
 The West Wing

4 nominations
 Heroes
 Moonlighting
 NYPD Blue
 Quantum Leap
 The Sopranos
 Star Trek: Deep Space Nine
 The X-Files

3 nominations
 Alias
 Deadwood
 Fame
 Hart to Hart
 Sex and the City
 St. Elsewhere
 The Tudors

2 nominations
 The Adams Chronicles
 Ally McBeal
 The Borgias
 Carnivàle
 Cybill
 Desperate Housewives
 Frasier
 Hill Street Blues
 Justified
 Mannix
 Maude
 Modern Family
 Murphy Brown
 Northern Exposure
 Pushing Daisies
 Rome
 Roots
 Thirtysomething
 Ugly Betty
 The Young Indiana Jones Chronicles

References

Art Direction for a Single-Camera Series
Awards established in 1956
Awards disestablished in 2013